Barville may refer to several communes in France:

Barville, Eure, in the Eure département
Barville, Orne, in the Orne département 
Barville, Vosges, in the Vosges département
Barville-en-Gâtinais, in the Loiret département